Sanspareils Greenlands, commonly known by the abbreviation SG, is an Indian cricket equipment manufacturer. Its balls are used in Test cricket and in the Ranji Trophy in India. They have a more prominent seam and are closer together than the Kookaburra balls used for Test matches, used in rest of the world apart from England and West Indies  (which use Dukes), resulting from the thicker thread used for stitching. The balls are also completely hand-crafted.

Brothers Kedarnath and Dwarakanath Anand established Sanspareils Co. in Sialkot in 1931. They were originally from Lahore where they apprenticed in their uncle's sports shop RICHIE Sports. In 1940 they established a company named Greenlands to facilitate export of their products. After the partition of India,  the family moved to Agra and then settled in Meerut in 1950. Its factory has been in Meerut, Uttar Pradesh since 1950.

SG has been exporting bats manufactured in Meerut to the UK and Australia for most of the international cricket brands. The company has been the market leader in the world with legends like Sunil Gavaskar, Mohammad Azharuddin and Rahul Dravid endorsing the brand. In 2008, Virender Sehwag became an SG brand ambassador.

Since 1994, every Test Match played in India has been played with SG balls. SG Test balls are handmade and are said to be 20% of the price of Kookaburra balls.

Criticism 
The SG Test Balls have come under severe criticism in recent times. Ravichandran Ashwin, has criticized the quality of SG Test Balls used recently, saying, "Right now, I say that the Kookaburra red ball is the best. Dukes is quite good. But I'm disappointed with the SG ball. It used to be top-notch when I started playing. The seam would be prominent even after 70 overs. It's not the same anymore." Kuldeep Yadav too shared his thoughts on the SG ball saying, "Kookaburra red ball is good to grip. SG is okay at the moment."

Indian captain Virat Kohli said that Test cricket across the globe should be played with the England-made Duke balls, expressing his displeasure at the poor quality of the SG balls that India use at home and supported the issues raised by Ashwin, saying, "I totally agree with him [Ashwin]. To have a ball scuffed up in five overs is something that we haven't seen before. The quality of the SG ball used to be quite high before and I don't understand the reason why it's gone down."

Speedster Umesh Yadav, joined the growing list of Indian players who feel the SG Test ball was not ideal, complained that it is ineffective to bowl with the SG Test Balls in India. He says that after the ball wears out, it offers no pace or bounce on flat Indian tracks and makes it difficult to contain the lower-order batsmen of the opposition.

References

External links
 

Sportswear brands
Cricket equipment manufacturers
Indian companies established in 1940
Companies based in Uttar Pradesh
Companies based in Meerut
Manufacturing companies established in 1940
Indian companies established in 1931